Hope Pym is a fictional character appearing in American comic books published by Marvel Comics. Created by Tom DeFalco and Ron Frenz, the character first appeared in A-Next #7 (April 1999) as the supervillain Red Queen. She is the daughter of Hank Pym and Janet van Dyne in the MC2 universe.

Evangeline Lilly portrays a different version of the character, Hope van Dyne, in the Marvel Cinematic Universe film Ant-Man (2015) and appears as the successor of the Wasp in the films Ant-Man and the Wasp (2018), Avengers: Endgame (2019), and Ant-Man and the Wasp: Quantumania (2023). Lilly returned in the animated series What If...? (2021) as an alternate version. Madeleine McGraw portrayed a young Hope in Ant-Man and the Wasp.

Publication history

The character was created by Tom DeFalco and Ron Frenz and first appeared in A-Next #7 (April 1999).

Fictional character biography
After the deaths of their parents, Hope Pym and her twin brother Big Man (Henry Pym, Jr.) became outraged when people began referring to A-Next as the "next generation" of Avengers. Using their parents' fortune, the twins put together the supervillain Revengers team and gained access to the Avengers Mansion via their parents' security codes. When they ambushed A-Next, Hope set about to torture Cassandra Lang, feeling that she's the Avengers' rightful heir. Hope was finally stopped when Henry Jr. prevented her from initiating the mansion's self-destruct sequence, which would have killed both A-Next and the Revengers.

The Red Queen was later seen using Silikong, a criminal that was mutated with a crystalized human, and his clones to get revenge on the A-Next, but her plans were thwarted by them and American Dream.

Sometime after the Spider-Verse event, the Red Queen teamed up with Entralla to take control of A-Next using hypnosis and planned to make Cassandra Lang/Stinger execute her own father, Scott Lang/Ant-Man. Her plans were thwarted by Spider-Girl (now known as Spider-Woman), the New Warriors and Uncle Ben/Spider-Man of Earth-3145.

Powers and abilities
As the Red Queen, Hope Pym uses implanted bio-wings to fly. Also, she has bio-electric blasters installed on the gloves on the back of her hands, and extendable claws built into her gloves. However, she apparently does not have the ability to alter her size.

Reception

Accolades 

 In 2020, Scary Mommy included Hope Pym in their "Looking For A Role Model? These 195+ Marvel Female Characters Are Truly Heroic" list.
 In 2022, Screen Rant included Hope Pym in their "10 Most Powerful Variants Of The Wasp In Marvel Comics" list.

In other media

Marvel Cinematic Universe

Evangeline Lilly portrays Hope van Dyne / Wasp in media set within the Marvel Cinematic Universe, with Madeleine McGraw portraying the character as a child in flashbacks depicted in Ant-Man and the Wasp. Hope appears in the live-action films Ant-Man (2015), Ant-Man and the Wasp, Avengers: Endgame, and Ant-Man and the Wasp: Quantumania. Additionally, an alternate timeline version appears in the Disney+ animated series What If...? episode "What If... Zombies?!".

Television
 Hope van Dyne / Wasp appears in the fourth season of Avengers Assemble, voiced by Kari Wahlgren. This version is a member of the All-New, All-Different Avengers.
 Hope van Dyne / Wasp appears in Ant-Man (2017), voiced by Melissa Rauch.

Video games
 Hope van Dyne / Wasp appears as a playable character in Lego Marvel's Avengers via DLC.
 Hope van Dyne / Wasp appears as a playable character in Marvel: Contest of Champions, Marvel: Future Fight, Marvel Strike Force, Marvel Puzzle Quest and Marvel Avengers Academy.

Miscellaneous
Hope van Dyne / Wasp appears in the Ant-Man and The Wasp: Nano Battle! attraction at Hong Kong Disneyland, with Evangeline Lilly reprising her role from the films.

References

Characters created by Ron Frenz
Characters created by Tom DeFalco
Comics characters introduced in 1999
Female characters in film
Fictional characters who can change size
Fictional twins
Marvel Comics female superheroes
Marvel Comics female supervillains
Marvel Comics film characters